Fiji–Israel relations were established in 1970. Relations between Fiji and Israel have generally been satisfactory. There is currently no embassy of Fiji in Israel, nor an Israeli embassy in Fiji.

History 
Despite being both former colonies of the British Empire, the first major visit to Israel by a Fijian official took place in 1978. In 1986, Israeli President Chaim Herzog visited Fiji.  

Fiji strained relations with Israel in July 2006, when three Israelis who arrived in Fiji on the 13th were arrested and deported. The three Israelis were detained in a jail cell at Nadi Airport for six hours for alleged mistreatment of Palestinians by Israel. 

In 2016, Israeli prime minister Benjamin Netanyahu met with Fijian prime minister Frank Bainimarama and thanked him.

In 2020, Israeli President Reuven Rivlin visited Fiji as part of a Pacific island nations' summit. In 2022, President Ratu Wiliame M. Katonivere visited Israel and met President Isaac Herzog at his official residence. In their meeting, they agreed to expand Israeli-Fijian relations with an emphasis on the potential use of Israeli environmental technologies and Israeli experience in the field of food security.

Following the 2022 Fijian general election, which resulted in a hung parliament, saw the People's Alliance, the National Federation Party (NFP) and the Social Democratic Liberal Party (SODELPA) begin negotiating to form a coalition government. SODELPA stated that opening an embassy in Jerusalem was one of the conditions for forming government with the two parties. The negotiations were successful and Fiji reaffirmed its commitment to opening an embassy in Jerusalem.

See also
Foreign relations of Fiji
Foreign Relations of Israel
History of the Jews in Fiji

References

Fiji–Israel relations
Israel
Fiji